Sesson Shūkei (1504 – c. 1589), born Satake Heizō was a Japanese Zen monk and painter from the Muromachi period.

Shūkei was born a member of the Satake clan, but left after being disinherited by his father and was inducted as a monk at Shōsō-ji temple, the Satake bodaiji. He is the most important painter who followed the style of Sesshū Tōyō (1420-1506). On the other hand, there is an different opinion (jp) that he was not influenced or affected by Sesshū although he paid his respects to Sesshū (雪舟) by using the same Kanji, 雪 which means snow, in his name, Sesson (雪村). In any case Sesson was the master of ink painting that Ibaraki Prefecture has ever produced, ranked with Sesshū and called "Sesshū of the west, Sesson of the east". His works are classic examples of Japanese ink painting which was imported via many artists from China.

He travelled to Aizu at least twice to give lessons in painting to the daimyō Ashina Moriuji – first in 1546, and then again in 1561 after Moriuki's retirement.

Gallery

References

Literature
 Frank Feltens, Yukio Lippit (Eds.): Sesson Shukei. A Zen Monk-Painter in Medieval Japan, Hirmer publishers, Munich 2021, ISBN 978-3-7774-3633-3.

External links
Bridge of dreams: the Mary Griggs Burke collection of Japanese art, a catalog from The Metropolitan Museum of Art Libraries (fully available online as PDF), which contains material on Sesson Shukei (see index)

Japanese painters
Japanese Buddhist clergy
1504 births
Year of death unknown
16th-century Japanese artists
16th-century Japanese painters
16th-century Japanese people
Zenga